Adesmia cancellata, the pitted beetle, is a species of desert beetle of the Tenebrionidae family that inhabits arid environments in the Middle East.

It was first formally described by the entomologist Johann Christoph Friedrich Klug in 1830.

References

Pimeliinae
Beetles described in 1830
Insects of the Middle East
Taxa named by Johann Christoph Friedrich Klug